The Soviet Union (USSR) competed at the 1956 Summer Olympics in Melbourne, Australia. 272 competitors, 233 men and 39 women, took part in 135 events in 17 sports.

Medalists
The USSR finished first in the final medal rankings, with 37 gold and 98 total medals.

Gold
 Valentin Muratov — Artistic gymnastics, men's floor exercise
 Larisa Latynina — Artistic gymnastics, women's floor exercise
 Viktor Chukarin — Artistic gymnastics, men's individual all-round
 Larisa Latynina — Artistic gymnastics, women's individual all-round
 Victor Chukarin — Artistic gymnastics, men's parallel bars
 Boris Shakhlin — Artistic gymnastics, men's pommel horse
 Albert Azaryan — Artistic gymnastics, men's rings
 Victor Chukarin, Valentin Muratov, Boris Shakhlin, Albert Azaryan, Yuri Titov, Pavel Stolbov — Artistic gymnastics, men's team competition
 Tamara Manina, Larisa Latynina, Sofia Muratova, Lidiya Kalinina-Ivanova, Polina Astakhova, Lyudmila Egorova — Artistic gymnastics, women's team competition
 Valentin Muratov — Artistic gymnastics, men's vault
 Larisa Latynina — Artistic gymnastics, women's vault
 Vladimir Kuts — Athletics, men's 10000 m
 Leonid Spirin — Athletics, men's 20 km walk
 Vladimir Kuts — Athletics, men's 5000 m
 Inese Jaunzeme — Athletics, women's javelin throw
 Tamara Tyshkevich — Athletics, women's shot put
 Vladimir Safronov — Boxing, men's featherweight
 Vladimir Yengibaryan — Boxing, men's light-welterweight
 Gennadi Shatkov — Boxing, men's 71–75 kg
 Pavel Kharin, Gratsian Botev — Canoeing, men's C-2 10000 m
 Elizaveta Dementyeva — Canoeing, women's K-1 500 m
 Lev Yashin, Nikolai Tishchenko, Mikhail Okonkov, Aleksei Paramonov, Anatoli Bashashkin, Igor Netto, Boris Tatushin, Anatoli Isayev, Eduard Streltsov, Valentin Ivanov, Vladimir Ryzhkin, Boris Kuznetsov, Iosif Betsa, Sergei Salnikov, Boris Razinsky, Anatoli Maslenkin, Anatoli Ilyin and Nikita Simonyan — Football (soccer), men's team competition
 Igor Novikov, Ivan Deryugin, Aleksandr Tarasov — Modern pentathlon, men's team competition
 Aleksandr Berkutov, Yuriy Tyukalov — Rowing, men's double sculls
 Vyacheslav Ivanov — Rowing, men's single sculls
 Vitali Romanenko — Shooting, men's 100 m running deer, single/double shots
 Vasily Borisov — Shooting, men's 300 m free rifle 3 positions
 Anatoli Bogdanov — Shooting, men's 50 m rifle 3 positions
 Igor Rybak — Weightlifting, men's lightweight
 Fedor Bogdanovsky — Weightlifting, men's middleweight
 Arkady Vorobyov — Weightlifting, men's middle-heavyweight
 Mirian Tsalkalamanidze — Wrestling, men's freestyle flyweight
 Anatoli Parfenov — Wrestling, men's Greco-Roman super-heavyweight
 Nikolai Soloviev — Wrestling, men's Greco-Roman flyweight
 Konstantin Vyrupaev — Wrestling, men's Greco-Roman bantamweight
 Givi Kartoziya — Wrestling, men's Greco-Roman middleweight
 Valentin Nikolayev — Wrestling, men's Greco-Roman light-heavyweight

Silver
 Tamara Manina — Artistic gymnastics, women's balance beam
 Victor Chukarin — Artistic gymnastics, men's floor exercise
 Yuri Titov — Artistic gymnastics, men's horizontal bar
 Valentin Muratov — Artistic gymnastics, men's rings
 Larisa Latynina — Artistic gymnastics, women's uneven bars
 Tamara Manina — Artistic gymnastics, women's vault
 Antanas Mikenas — Athletics, men's 20 km walk
 Leonid Bartenev, Yuriy Konovalov, Vladimir Sukharev, Boris Tokarev — Athletics, men's 4 × 100 m relay
 Yevgeniy Maskinskov — Athletics, men's 50 km walk
 Irina Beglyakova — Athletics, women's discus throw
 Mikhail Krivonosov — Athletics, men's hammer throw
 Mariya Pisareva — Athletics, women's high jump
 Galina Zybina — Athletics, women's shot put
 Valdis Muizhniek, Maigonis Valdmanis, Vladimir Torban, Stasys Stonkus, Kazys Petkevičius, Arkadi Bochkarev, Jānis Krūmiņš, Mikhail Semyonov, Algirdas Lauritenas, Yuri Ozerov, Viktor Zubkov, Mikhail Studenetsky — Basketball, men's team competition
 Lev Mukhin — Boxing, men's heavyweight
 Pavel Kharin, Gratsian Botev — Canoeing, men's C-2 1000 m
 Igor Pissarev — Canoeing, men's K-1 1000 m
 Mikhail Kaaleste, Anatoli Demitkov — Canoeing, men's K-2 1000 m
 Igor Buldakov, Viktor Ivanov — Rowing, men's coxless pair
 Yevgeni Cherkasov — Shooting, men's 25 m rapid fire pistol
 Allan Erdman — Shooting, men's 300 m free rifle 3 positions
 Makhmud Umarov — Shooting, men's 50 m pistol
 Vasily Borisov — Shooting, men's 50 m rifle prone
 Vladimir Stogov — Weightlifting, men's bantamweight
 Yevgeni Minaev — Weightlifting, men's featherweight
 Ravil Khabutdinov — Weightlifting, men's lightweight
 Vasili Stepanov — Weightlifting, men's light-heavyweight
 Boris Kulayev — Wrestling, men's freestyle light-heavyweight
 Vladimir Maneev — Wrestling, men's Greco-Roman welterweight

Bronze
 Yuri Titov — Artistic gymnastics, men's individual all-round
 Sofia Muratova — Artistic gymnastics, women's individual all-round
 Victor Chukarin — Artistic gymnastics, men's pommel horse
 Tamara Manina, Larisa Latynina, Sofia Muratova, Lidiya Kalinina-Ivanova, Polina Astakhova, Lyudmila Egorova — Artistic gymnastics, women's team, portable apparatus
 Sofia Muratova — Artistic gymnastics, women's uneven bars
 Yuri Titov — Artistic gymnastics, men's vault
 Bruno Junk — Athletics, men's 20 km walk
 Ardalion Ignatyev — Athletics, men's 400 m
 Vasili Kuznetsov — Athletics, men's decathlon
 Nina Romashkova — Athletics, women's discus throw
 Anatoli Samotsvetov — Athletics, men's hammer throw
 Igor Kashkarov — Athletics, men's high jump
 Viktor Tsybulenko — Athletics, men's javelin throw
 Nadezhda Konyaeva — Athletics, women's javelin throw
 Nadezhda Khnykina-Dvalishvili — Athletics, women's long jump
 Vitold Kreer — Athletics, men's triple jump
 Anatoli Lagetko — Boxing, men's lightweight
 Romualdas Murauskas — Boxing, men's light-heavyweight
 Gennady Bukharin — Canoeing, men's C-1 10000 m
 Gennady Bukharin — Canoeing, men's C-1 1000 m
 Lev Kuznetsov — Fencing, men's sabre individual
 Yakov Rylsky, David Tyshler, Lev Kuznetsov, Yevgeni Cherepovsky, Leonid Bogdanov — Fencing, men's sabre team
 Igor Emchuk, Heorhiy Zhylin, Vladimir Petrov — Rowing, men's pair-oared shell with coxswain
 Vladimir Sevryugin — Shooting, men's 100 m running deer, single/double shots
 Kharis Yunichev — Swimming, men's 200 m breaststroke
 Vitali Sorokin, Vladimir Struzhanov, Gennadi Nikolaev, Boris Nikitin — Swimming, men's 4 × 200 m freestyle relay
 Boris Goikhman, Valentin Prokopov, Yuri Shlyapin, Vyacheslav Kurennoi, Pyotr Breus, Pyotr Mshvenieradze, Boris Markarov, Mikhail Ryzhak, Viktor Ageev and Nodar Gvakhariya — Water polo, men's team competition
 Mikhail Shakhov — Wrestling, men's freestyle bantamweight
 Alimbeg Bestaev — Wrestling, men's freestyle lightweight
 Vakhtang Balavadze — Wrestling, men's freestyle welterweight
 Georgi Skhirtladze — Wrestling, men's freestyle middleweight
 Roman Dzeneladze — Wrestling, men's Greco-Roman featherweight

Athletics

Men's 110 m hurdles
 Boris Stolyarov
 Heat — 14.4s
 Semifinals — 14.5s
 Final — 14.6s (→ 6th place)

 Anatoly Mikhailov
 Heat — 14.5s (→ did not advance)

Men's marathon
 Ivan Filine — 2:30:37 (→ 7th place)
 Boris Grichaev — did not finish (→ no ranking)
 Albert Ivanov — did not finish (→ no ranking)

Basketball

Boxing

Canoeing

Cycling

 Sprint
 Boris Romanov — 7th place

 Time trial
 Boris Savostin — 1:12.3 (→ 5th place)

 Tandem
 Rostislav VargashkinVladimir Leonov — 9th place

 Team pursuit
 Eduard GusevRodislav ChizhikovViktor IlyinVolodymyr Mitin — 8th place

 Team road race
 Anatoly CherepovichMykola KolumbetViktor Kapitonov — 63 points (→ 6th place)

 Individual road race
 Anatoly Cherepovich — 5:23:50 (→ 15th place)
 Mykola Kolumbet — 5:23:50 (→ 16th place)
 Viktor Kapitonov — 5:30:45 (→ 32nd place)
 Viktor Vershinin — 5:34:21 (→ 35th place)

Diving

Men's 10 m platform
 Roman Brener
 Preliminary Round — 76.56
 Final — 142.95 (→ 5th place)
 Mikhail Chachba
 Preliminary Round — 73.02
 Final — 134.52 (→ 8th place)
 Gennady Galkin
 Preliminary Round — 68.92 (→ did not advance, 13th place)

Women's 3 m platform
 Zoya Blyuvas
 Preliminary Round — 62.12
 Final — 98.15 (→ 11th place)

Women's 10 m platform
 Tatyana Karakashyants-Vereina
 Preliminary Round — 52.19
 Final — 76.95 (→ 9th place)
 Lyubov Shigalova
 Preliminary Round — 49.22
 Final — 76.40 (→ 9th place)
 Raisa Gorokhovskaya
 Preliminary Round — 52.64
 Final — 73.84 (→ 9th place)

Fencing

20 fencers, 17 men and 3 women, represented the Soviet Union in 1956.

 Men's foil
 Mark Midler
 Yury Rudov
 Iuri Osip'ovi

 Men's team foil
 Yury Rudov, Iuri Osip'ovi, Mark Midler, Aleksandr Ovsyankin, Viktor Zhdanovich, Yury Ivanov

 Men's épée
 Arnold Chernushevich
 Revaz Tsirek'idze
 Juozas Ūdras

 Men's team épée
 Arnold Chernushevich, Valentin Chernikov, Lev Saychuk, Revaz Tsirek'idze, Juozas Ūdras, Valentin Vdovichenko

 Men's sabre
 Lev Kuznetsov
 Yevgeny Cherepovsky
 Yakov Rylsky

 Men's team sabre
 Lev Kuznetsov, Yakov Rylsky, Yevgeny Cherepovsky, David Tyshler, Leonid Bogdanov

 Women's foil
 Emma Yefimova
 Valentina Rastvorova
 Nadezhda Shitikova

Football

Gymnastics

Modern pentathlon

Three male pentathletes represented the Soviet Union in 1956. The Soviet pentathletes won gold in the team event.

Individual
 Igor Novikov
 Aleksandr Tarasov
 Ivan Deriuhin

Team
 Igor Novikov
 Aleksandr Tarasov
 Ivan Deriuhin

Rowing

The Soviet Union had 25 male rowers participate in seven rowing events in 1956.

 Men's single sculls – 1st place ( gold medal)
 Vyacheslav Ivanov (Вячеслав Иванов)

 Men's double sculls – 1st place ( gold medal)
 Aleksandr Berkutov (Александр Беркутов)
 Yuriy Tyukalov (Юрий Тюкалов)

 Men's coxless pair – 2nd place ( silver medal)
 Igor Buldakov (Игорь Булдаков)
 Viktor Ivanov (Виктор Иванов)

 Men's coxed pair – 3rd place ( bronze medal)
 Ihor Yemchuk (Ihor Yemchuk, Игорь Емчук)
 Heorhiy Zhylin (Georgy Zhilin, Георгий Жилин)
 Vladimir Petrov (Владимир Петров)

 Men's coxless four
 Leonid Zakharov (Леонид Захаров)
 Aleksandr Sheff (Александр Шефф)
 Nikolay Karasyov (Николай Карасёв)
 Igor Ivanov (Игорь Иванов)

 Men's coxed four
 Andrey Arkhipov (Андрей Архипов)
 Yury Popov (Юрий Попов)
 Valentin Zanin (Валентин Занин)
 Yaroslav Cherstvy (Ярослав Черствый)
 Anatoly Fetisov (Анатолий Фетисов)

 Men's eight
 Ernest Verbin (Эрнест Вербин)
 Boris Fyodorov (Борис Фёдоров)
 Slava Amiragov (Слава Амирагов)
 Leonid Gissen (Леонид Гиссен)
 Yevgeny Samsonov (Евгений Самсонов)
 Anatoly Antonov (Анатолий Антонов)
 Georgy Gushchenko (Георгий Гущенко)
 Vladimir Kryukov (Владимир Крюков)
 Vladimir Petrov (Владимир Петров)

Sailing

Shooting

Eleven shooters represented the Soviet Union in 1956.

 25 m pistol
 Yevgeny Cherkasov
 Vasily Sorokin

 50 m pistol
 Makhmud Umarov
 Anton Yasynskiy

 300 m rifle, three positions
 Vasily Borisov
 Allan Erdman

 50 m rifle, three positions
 Anatoly Bogdanov
 Vasily Borisov

 50 m rifle, prone
 Vasily Borisov
 Anatoly Bogdanov

 100 m running deer
 Vitali Romanenko
 Vladimir Sevryugin

 Trap
 Nikolay Mogilevsky
 Yury Nikandrov

Swimming

Water polo

Weightlifting

Wrestling

Medals by republic
In the following table for team events number of team representatives, who received medals are counted, not "one medal for all the team", as usual. Because there were people from different republics in one team.

References

External links
 Official Olympic Reports
 International Olympic Committee results database
  – for medal stats by republic

Nations at the 1956 Summer Olympics
1956
Summer Olympics